John Smith (October 27, 1831 – March 5, 1909) was a Scottish-born Ontario businessman and political figure. He represented Peel in the Legislative Assembly of Ontario from 1893 to 1908 as a Liberal member.

He was born in Inverness in 1831, the son of Andrew Smith, and came to Peel County, Upper Canada with his family in 1832. He was educated in Chinguacousy Township. Smith was an auctioneer and served on the town council for Brampton. He was elected to the provincial legislature in an 1893 by-election held after Kenneth Chisholm was appointed county registrar.

Smith died of pneumonia in 1909.

External links 
The Canadian parliamentary companion, 1897 JA Gemmill
 
Obituary transcribed from the Orangeville Banner

1831 births
1909 deaths
Deaths from pneumonia in Ontario
Ontario Liberal Party MPPs
Scottish emigrants to Canada